Abdourahmane Dieye (born 14 February 1988 in Dreux, France) is a French footballer, who currently plays for SC Cers-Portiragnes.

He played 16 matches for French Ligue 2 club Le Mans during the 2010–2011 season.

References

French footballers
French sportspeople of Senegalese descent
1988 births
Living people
Association football midfielders
Rodez AF players
Les Herbiers VF players
Luçon FC players
AS Béziers (2007) players
RCO Agde players
Sportspeople from Dreux
Footballers from Centre-Val de Loire